York South was an electoral district (or "riding") in Ontario, Canada, that was represented in the House of Commons of Canada from 1904 to 1979.

The riding is notable for the 1942 federal by-election in which newly elected Conservative leader Arthur Meighen was defeated in his attempt to win a seat in the House of Commons by the Co-operative Commonwealth Federation's (CCF) candidate (assisted by the Liberals). The election was a major breakthrough for the CCF, and ended Meighen's attempt to return to politics. In later years, it became known as perennial leaders' riding, the home district for both CCF and New Democratic Party (NDP) leaders Ted Jolliffe, Donald C. MacDonald, David Lewis and Bob Rae.

History
York South was created in 1903 as "the south riding of York" from parts of York East and York West ridings. It initially consisted of the township of York, and the towns of East Toronto, North Toronto, and Toronto Junction. As is suggested by the names of the towns in the riding, the constituency abutted on the city of Toronto's northern border.

In 1914, it was called "South York", and redefined to consist of the villages of Richmond Hill and Markham, the township of Markham, the town of Leaside, and the township of York (excluding parts included in the riding of West York); and those portions of the city of Toronto not included in the ridings of West York, Parkdale, North Toronto, East Toronto, Centre Toronto, West Toronto, South Toronto and East York. In 1924, it was called "York South", and consisted of all that part of the county of York lying east of Yonge Street, south of the township of Markham and outside the city of Toronto.

In 1933, York South was defined to consist of all that portion of the township of York not included in the electoral district of West York, the town of Weston and the village of Forest Hill. From 1947, it consisted of the village of Forest Hill and a portion of the township of York. In 1952, it consisted the village of Forest Hill and a re-defined portion of the township of York.

As time progressed and the population grew, the riding shrank in size so that it consisted of what was later called the Borough of York in the middle western part of Metropolitan Toronto and some surrounding areas. While it was originally a largely rural riding it was an urban, working class riding by the end of World War II.

The electoral district was abolished in 1976 when the main part of the riding became York South—Weston, and other parts were redistributed between Davenport, Eglinton—Lawrence and St. Paul's ridings.

Members of Parliament

This riding elected the following members of the House of Commons of Canada:

Election results

South riding of York

|-
 
|Independent Conservative
|William Findlay Maclean
|align="right"|2,418 
 
|Unknown
|Alexander J. Anderson
|align="right"|1,790  

|-
 
|Independent Conservative
|William Findlay Maclean
|align="right"| acclaimed

|-
 
|Independent Conservative
|William Findlay Maclean
|align="right"| 7,194 
 
|Unknown
|Louis Franklin Heyd
|align="right"| 1,901

South York

|-
  
|Government (Unionist)
|William Findlay Maclean
|align="right"|16,088
  
|Opposition (Laurier Liberals)
|Alexander MacGregor
|align="right"| 2,065 
  
|Labour
|James Thomas Gunn
|align="right"|1,977   
 
|Unknown
|John Galbraith
|align="right"|118   

|-
 
|Independent Conservative
|William Findlay Maclean
|align="right"|10,368   
  
|Liberal
|Alexander MacGregor
|align="right"|8,015

York South

|-
 
|Independent Conservative
|William Findlay MacLean
|align="right"|7,762    
  
|Liberal
|Russell James Reesor
|align="right"|1,394 
 
|Independent Conservative
|John Galbraith
|align="right"| 990 

|-
  
|Conservative
|Robert Henry McGregor
|align="right"| 6,555 
 
|Independent Conservative
|William Findlay MacLean
|align="right"| 4,880 

|-
  
|Conservative
|Robert Henry McGregor
|align="right"| 11,852 
  
|Liberal
|Dennis McCarthy
|align="right"| 5,394    

|-
  
|Conservative
|Earl Lawson
|align="right"|11,596 
 
|Co-operative Commonwealth
|Luke Teskey
|align="right"| 8,247   
  
|Liberal
|Elmore Philpott
|align="right"| 7,059 

|-
  
|National Government
|Alan Cockeram
|align="right"|15,346 
  
|Liberal
| F. J. MacRae
|align="right"| 12,864 
 
|Co-operative Commonwealth
|Joseph W. Noseworthy
|align="right"| 5,372   

By-election: On Mr. Cockeram's resignation to allow Arthur Meighen to contest the seat:

|-
 
|Co-operative Commonwealth
|Joseph W. Noseworthy
|align="right"|16,408   
  
|Conservative
|Arthur Meighen
|align="right"| 11,952    

|-
  
|Progressive Conservative
|Alan Cockeram
|align="right"|16,666   
 
|Co-operative Commonwealth
|Joseph W. Noseworthy
|align="right"|13,543   
  
|Liberal
|John Harvey Lynes
|align="right"| 9,104

|-
 
|Co-operative Commonwealth
|Joseph W. Noseworthy
|align="right"|15,293
  
|Progressive Conservative
|Alan Cockeram
|align="right"|14,273 
  
|Liberal
| Eric R. Marsden
|align="right"| 11,932   

|-
 
|Co-operative Commonwealth
|Joseph W. Noseworthy
|align="right"|12,216   
  
|Liberal
|Alfred Green
|align="right"|10,820   
  
|Progressive Conservative
|Alan Cockeram
|align="right"| 10,116

|-
  
|Progressive Conservative
|William George Beech
|align="right"| 16,624 
  
|Liberal
|Marvin Gelber
|align="right"| 12,232 
 
|Co-operative Commonwealth
|William Sefton
|align="right"| 12,024 

|-
  
|Progressive Conservative
|William George Beech
|align="right"| 22,980
  
|Liberal
|Marvin Gelber
|align="right"| 13,141
 
|Co-operative Commonwealth
|Bill Sefton
|align="right"| 9,643 

|-
 
|New Democratic
|David Lewis
|align="right"|19,101   
  
|Liberal
|Marvin Gelber
|align="right"|15,423 
  
|Progressive Conservative
|William George Beech
|align="right"|12,552 

|-
  
|Liberal
|Marvin Gelber
|align="right"| 21,042 
 
|New Democratic
|David Lewis
|align="right"| 17,396  
  
|Progressive Conservative
|William George Beech
|align="right"|9,648   

|-
 
|New Democratic
|David Lewis
|align="right"|21,693 
  
|Liberal
|Marvin Gelber
|align="right"| 18,098  
  
|Progressive Conservative
|Maxwell Rotstein
|align="right"| 6,427   

|-
 
|New Democratic
|David Lewis
|align="right"|12,357    
  
|Liberal
|Ron Barbaro
|align="right"|11,693   
  
|Progressive Conservative
|Cy Townsend
|align="right"|4,499    

|-
 
|New Democratic
|David Lewis
|align="right"|14,225   
  
|Liberal
|Lucio Appolloni
|align="right"|9,551
  
|Progressive Conservative
|John Oostrom
|align="right"| 6,401 
 
|Unknown 
|Keith Corkhill
|align="right"|172

References 
York South entry on the House of Commons website includes election results and the changing descriptions of the riding's boundaries.

Former federal electoral districts of Ontario
Federal electoral districts of Toronto